This is a list of ambassadors to Cyprus. Note that some ambassadors are responsible for more than one country while others are directly accredited to Nicosia.

Current Ambassadors to Nicosia

See also
 Foreign relations of Cyprus
 List of diplomatic missions of Cyprus
 List of diplomatic missions in Cyprus

References
 

Cyprus